Rhabdochaeta multilineata is a species of tephritid or fruit flies in the genus Rhabdochaeta of the family Tephritidae.

Distribution
Thailand, Malaysia, Philippines, Indonesia.

References

Tephritinae
Insects described in 1941
Diptera of Asia